Brush Creek is an unincorporated community in Williamson County, Tennessee, United States.

Historical Features

Isola Bella Plantation
The Isola Bella Plantation's previous owner was Franklin Pike and it is an antebellum home just south of Concord Road. Valued at 3.9 million dollars, the home originally had approximately 6,000 square feet. The original build date is estimated at 1840 by James and Narcissa Merrit Johnston. They built it on land that belong to David Johnston. It served as a hospital and as a military headquarters. It was a hospital for a time during the 1864 and possibly 1865. The time it spent as a military headquarters was under the orders of General John B. Hood. The house is located at exactly 35.9964509 latitude, -86.8091668 longitude.

References

Unincorporated communities in Williamson County, Tennessee
Unincorporated communities in Tennessee